Olsen's Big Moment is a 1933 American pre-Code comedy film directed by Malcolm St. Clair and written by Henry Johnson and James J. Tynan. The film stars El Brendel, Walter Catlett, Barbara Weeks, Susan Fleming, John Arledge and Joe Sawyer. The film was released on November 17, 1933, by Fox Film Corporation.

Plot

Cast        
El Brendel as Knute Olsen
Walter Catlett as Robert Brewster III
Barbara Weeks as Jane Van Allen
Susan Fleming as Virginia West
John Arledge as Harry Smith
Joe Sawyer as 'Dapper' Danny Reynolds

References

External links
 

1933 films
1930s English-language films
Fox Film films
American comedy films
1933 comedy films
Films directed by Malcolm St. Clair
American black-and-white films
1930s American films